Albert Dupuy (born February 1, 1947) is a French civil servant.

He was born in Alicante, Spain.

He was prefect of the French overseas territory of St. Pierre and Miquelon, from January 2005 to August 2006.

From December 2008 to July 2010, he was prefect of Isère.

References 

1947 births
Living people
High Commissioners of New Caledonia
Prefects of Saint Pierre and Miquelon
Saint Pierre and Miquelon politicians
Prefects of Isère